Karl Hermann von Thile (Berlin, 19 December 1812 – Berlin, 26 December 1889) was a German diplomat, and the first Foreign Secretary of Germany and head of the Foreign Office (21 March 1871 – 30 September 1872).

He became a diplomat in the Kingdom of Prussia in 1837, and was sent to Rome, Berne, Vienna and London, before he was appointed as the Envoy to Rome in 1854, succeeding Christian Karl Josias von Bunsen. In 1862 he became Under-Secretary of State in the Prussian Ministry of Foreign Affairs.

As Secretary of State, he wielded less power over the direction of the foreign policy than Chancellor Otto von Bismarck.

Literature 
 Gregorovius, Ferdinand: "Briefe von Ferdinand Gregorovius an den Staatssekretär Hermann von Thile", (Herausgeber Herman von Petersdorff), Berlin 1894
 Sass, J.: "Hermann von Thile u. Bismarck. Mit unveröffentlichten Briefen Thiles". Preußisches Jbb., 217, 257–279

1812 births
1889 deaths
Politicians from Berlin
Foreign Secretaries of Germany